Sekolah Menengah Kebangsaan Aminuddin Baki, Johor Bahru (SABJB), is a public national school in Johor Bahru, Johor, Malaysia. It is located on Jalan Abdul Samad. Schools surrounding SAB include S.M.K. Sultan Ismail (SSI), SMK Mohd Khalid Johor Bahru and S.J.K.(C) Foon Yew 2.

The school is named after Aminuddin Baki, who has been granted the soubriquet Bapa Pendidikan Malaysia (Father of Malaysian Education).

History
1962
 The school was formed. Male students were put up at Maktab Sultan Abu Bakar, (MSAB), Johor Bahru, female students were put up at S.M. (P) Sultan Ibrahim,(SIGS), Johor Bahru.

1964
 The current school complex was built and ready to be used.
It was named Lower Secondary School.

1968
 Remove class students were accepted into the school. SABJB was inaugurated by the Minister of Education, YB Encik Mohd. Khir Johari.
 The fountain between the two main buildings was built with funds donated by the students.

1970
 Form 4 students were accepted into the school.

1971-1972
 Basketball team coach was Mr Ken Sundrom from USA. Team captains were Ng Kim Su and Yeo Hong Heng. Team players : Siow Kong Weng, Hanafi, Wahab, Tan Chee Seng, Thing Chee Meng, Tan Kim Wah, Seto, etc.

1972...
 The late Mr Goh Tien Huat was the headmaster until 1972.

1986
 SABJB celebrated its silver jubilee which was officiated by the Minister of Education, YB Datuk Abdullah Ahmad Badawi.

1988
 Two Form 6 classes (arts stream) were started.

2003
 The principal, Puan Hajah Satia Binti Kasim, was appointed as the district education officer (Pegawai Pendidikan Daerah), for Johor Bahru, the first woman to hold the position.

External links
 https://en-gb.facebook.com/SMK-Aminuddin-Baki-Johor-Bahru-137376856278438/

1962 establishments in Malaya
Buildings and structures in Johor Bahru
Secondary schools in Malaysia
Schools in Johor
Educational institutions established in 1962